Henri Garcin (born Anton Albers; 11 April 1928 – 13 June 2022) was a Belgian film actor. He appeared in more than 100 films from 1956 to 2022.

Selected filmography

 Mademoiselle and Her Gang (1957)
 Mata Hari, Agent H21 (1964)
 A Matter of Resistance (1965)
 Judoka-Secret Agent (1966)
 Les Gauloises bleues (1968)
 The Cop (1970)
 Someone Behind the Door (1971)
 Les Guichets du Louvre (1974)
 Verdict (1974)
 Love at the Top (1974)
 The Common Man (1975)
 The More It Goes, the Less It Goes (1977)
 An Almost Perfect Affair (1979)
 La Femme flic (1980)
 The Woman Next Door (1981)
 A Hundred and One Nights (1995)
 The Eighth Day (1996)
 The Proprietor (1996)
 The Dress (1996)
 The Pink Panther (2006)
 My Best Friend (2006)
 Schneider vs. Bax (2015)
 Tonio (2016)

References

External links

1928 births
2022 deaths
Belgian male film actors
Belgian male television actors
Actors from Antwerp
20th-century Belgian male actors
21st-century Belgian male actors